Kolo Fuma is a community in Bas-Congo Province, Democratic Republic of the Congo (DRC). It is served by Nkolo-Fuma Airport.

References

http://www.places-in-the-world.com/2314013-cd-place-kolo.html

Populated places in Kongo Central